Paul William Coteusis an electrical engineer at IBM's T.J. Watson Research Center in Yorktown Heights, New York.

Coteus was named a Fellow of the Institute of Electrical and Electronics Engineers (IEEE) in 2013 for his contributions to packaging for high performance computing systems.

References

20th-century births
Living people
Fellow Members of the IEEE
Year of birth missing (living people)
Place of birth missing (living people)
American electrical engineers